Stephen Woodworth (born January 5, 1954) is a Canadian politician. He represented the electoral district of Kitchener Centre in the House of Commons of Canada for the Conservative Party of Canada in the 40th and 41st Parliaments (2008–2015).

Politics and elected office
Woodworth first ran for public office in the 1988 federal election, representing the Liberal Party in the riding of Waterloo, finishing second to veteran Progressive Conservative MP Walter McLean. For the 1993 federal election, he again sought the Liberal nomination in Waterloo, but this time lost to Andrew Telegdi.

In 1994, Woodworth was elected to the Waterloo Catholic District School Board, representing Kitchener, and served in that capacity until 2003. During his tenure, Woodworth fought to prevent sex education from being taught in local Catholic high schools.

In the 2008 Canadian federal election, Woodworth ran for the Conservative Party of Canada and was elected as an MP for Kitchener Centre, defeating incumbent Liberal Karen Redman by a margin of 339 votes. He was re-elected in 2011, topping Redman by more than 5,500 votes in a rematch of the 2008 contest.

As an MP, Woodworth served as a member of several parliamentary committees, including the committees for Environment and Sustainable Development, Justice and Human Rights, Public Accounts, and Fisheries and Oceans.

Abortion debate
In 2012, Woodworth introduced Motion 312, a private member's motion which attempted to reopen the debate around Canadian abortion law. The bill proposed to create a special committee to redefine Canada's legal definition of human being. The motion was defeated 203–91.

In 2013, Woodworth followed up with a second private member's motion, Motion 476, again attempting to challenge Canada's abortion laws. However, Woodworth failed to receive the unanimous consent of Parliament required to reopen the debate after his previous motion was defeated.

After Parliament
In the 2015 Canadian federal election, Woodworth lost his seat to Liberal candidate Raj Saini by a margin of nearly 10,000 votes.

In 2016, Woodworth founded the Democracy Defence Initiative, an anti-abortion advocacy group.

He attempted a political comeback at Kitchener Centre in the 2019 Canadian federal election, placing third behind incumbent Raj Saini and Green Party candidate Mike Morrice.

Electoral record

References

External links
Stephen Woodworth

1954 births
Canadian anti-abortion activists
Canadian Roman Catholics
Conservative Party of Canada MPs
Lawyers in Ontario
Living people
Members of the House of Commons of Canada from Ontario
Politicians from Kitchener, Ontario
University of Western Ontario alumni
Wilfrid Laurier University alumni
Western Law School alumni
21st-century Canadian politicians
Ontario school board trustees